Drugs and medications should be avoided while pregnant. Women should speak to their doctor or healthcare professional before starting or stopping any medications while pregnant. Tobacco, alcohol, marijuana, and illicit drug use while pregnant may be dangerous for the unborn baby and may lead to severe health problems and/or birth defects. Even small amounts of alcohol, tobacco, and marijuana have not been proven to be safe when taken while pregnant. In some cases, for example, if the mother has epilepsy or diabetes, the risk of stopping a medication may be worse than risks associated with taking the medication while pregnant. The mother's healthcare professional will help make these decisions about the safest way to protect the health of both the mother and unborn child. In addition to medications and substances, some dietary supplements are important for a healthy pregnancy, however, others may cause harm to the unborn child.

The Food and Drug Administration (FDA) in the United States reports that there are six million pregnancies with at least 50% of the women taking at least one medication. In addition a reported 5–10% of women of childbearing age use alcohol or addictive substances. Of those who bear children, recreational drug use can have serious consequences to the health of not only the mother, but also the fetus as many medications can cross the placenta and reach the fetus. Some of the consequences on the babies include physical abnormalities, higher risk of stillbirth, neonatal abstinence syndrome (NAS), sudden infant death syndrome (SIDS), and others.

Medications 
Some medications can cause harm to the unborn baby, but in some instances the benefits may outweigh the risks to the baby or mother. A woman who has diabetes mellitus may need intensive therapy with insulin to prevent complications to the mother and baby.

Medications used to treat diabetes 
Gestational diabetes is a form of diabetes that is first diagnosed during pregnancy and can accordingly cause high blood sugar that affects the woman and the baby. In 10 - 20% of women whose diet and exercise are not adequate enough to control blood sugar, insulin injections may be required to lower blood sugar levels. Medications that can be used in diabetes during pregnancy include insulin, glyburide and metformin.

Pain Medications 
The most common over-the-counter pain-relieving medications include aspirin, acetaminophen (Tylenol), and non-steroidal anti-inflammatory drugs (NSAIDs), which include naproxen (Aleve), ibuprofen (Advil/Motrin), among others. The safety of these medications vary by class and by strength.

Pregnant women who use prescription medications containing opioids while pregnant may cause serious harm to the mother or unborn child. For some people, the risk of stopping a medication such as prescription opioids may be more serious than the risk of taking a medication.

Acetaminophen 
Short-term use of acetaminophen as directed is one of the only medications recommended for treating pain and fever in women who are pregnant. There is no established association with teratogenicity or elevated occurrence of birth defects and the usage of acetaminophen at any point during a pregnancy. There is potential for fetal liver toxicity in cases of maternal overdose, where the mother consumes more than the recommended daily dose.

Non-steroidal anti-inflammatory medications (NSAIDs) 
Ibuprofen and naproxen have not frequently been studied during pregnancy, but recent studies do not show increased risk of spontaneous abortion within the first six weeks of pregnancy. However, all NSAIDs showed association with structural cardiac defects with usage during the early weeks of pregnancy. When ibuprofen and naproxen are used within the third trimester, there is a significant increase in the risk of premature closure of the ductus arteriosus with primary pulmonary hypertension in the newborn. Between the lack of studies of the effect of ibuprofen and naproxen on pregnancy, it is recommended that pregnant women avoid these medications or use them sparingly per physician recommendations.

Aspirin 
Usage of aspirin during pregnancy is not recommended. Aspirin use during pregnancy has not demonstrated an increased risk of spontaneous abortion within the early weeks of pregnancy. However, its usage during organogenesis and the third trimester can lead to elevated risk of intrauterine growth retardation and maternal hemorrhage.

Pain medications containing opioids 
For more information, see the below section on Recreational drugs

Any medications containing opioids may be dangerous for the unborn baby and should not be taken while pregnant.

Anticonvulsant medications 
Most women with epilepsy deliver healthy babies and have a healthy pregnancy, however, some women with epilepsy are at a higher risk for losing their baby (stillborn) and of the baby having birth defects such as neural tube defects. Women who have epilepsy require advice from their doctor to determine the safest way to protect both the mother and unborn child from health risks associated with seizures and the risk of birth defects associated with some of the commonly prescribed anticonvulsant medications. Valproic acid and its derivatives such as sodium valproate and divalproex sodium may cause congenital malformations (birth defects). An increased dose causes decreased intelligence quotient. Valproic acid use during pregnancy increases the risk of neural tube defects by approximately 20-fold. Evidence is conflicting for carbamazepine regarding any increased risk of congenital physical anomalies or neurodevelopmental disorders by intrauterine exposure. Similarly, children exposed to lamotrigine or phenytoin in the womb do not seem to differ in their skills compared to those who were exposed to carbamazepine.

Antacids 
Heartburn is a common symptom of late term pregnancy during which up to 80% of pregnant women have experienced it by the end of their third trimester. Heartburn often indicates the development of gastro-esophageal reflux disease (GERD), where the lower esophageal sphincter relaxes due to elevated progesterone levels causing increased frequency and severity of gastric reflux or heartburn. If heartburn appears after 20 weeks of gestational age or is severe and persistent, this can indicate other conditions including HELLP syndrome and preeclampsia.

Common antacids include aluminum hydroxide/magnesium hydroxide (Maalox) and calcium carbonate (Tums). Histamine H2 blockers and proton pump inhibitors, such as famotidine (Pepcid) and omeprazole (Prilosec), respectively, can also be used to help relieve heartburn, with no known teratogenic effects or congenital malformations. Aluminum hydroxide/magnesium hydroxide and calcium carbonate, when consumed, do not cross the placenta and are regarded as safe pharmacological options to treat heartburn, since there are no significant association with maldevelopment or injury to fetus.

Ginger and acupressure are common non-pharmacological options used to treat nausea and vomiting as alternatives to antacids, histamine H2 blockers, and proton pump inhibitors. Lifestyle modifications are often recommended as well. Recommended modifications can include avoiding fatty food, reducing size and frequency of meals, and reducing caffeine intake.

Antiacne 
Acne vulgaris (acne) can occur in pregnancy possibly due to the hormonal changes influencing sebum production. There are limited antiacne medications that are safe in pregnancy. External applications of azelaic acid, glycolic acid, or benzoyl peroxide (alone or combined with clindamycin or erythromycin) are the safest options to treat mild to moderate acne. Erythromycin is the antibiotic of choice for severe acne, barring the use of its estolate salt which risks maternal hepatotoxicity. Topical nicotinamide and topical zinc are safe, however, there are no FDA pregnancy category ratings. Topical salicylic acid and topical dapsone are classified as FDA pregnancy category C. Acne medications to avoid during pregnancy include oral isotretinoin and topical tazarotene as there have been reports of birth defects. As safety data is lacking, the use of topical retinoids, such as adapalene and tretinoin, is not recommended. Antiandrogenic drugs, including spironolactone and cyproterone acetate, should be avoided. If planning to conceive while using contraindicated medications, a washout and waiting period before conception is advised. A herbal product, vitex agnus-castus should not be used during gestation due to undesirable hormonal effects.

Safety data supports the use of blue and red light therapy as non-drug treatments to consider. Personal hygiene and a healthy lifestyle also help, however dietary restriction and abrasive agents found in facial cleaning products are not beneficial. As there are limited options to safely treat acne in pregnancy, shared decision-making between the health care provider and client is recommended.

Anticoagulants 
Anticoagulants are medications that prevent the blood from forming clots and are also known as blood thinners. These medications are commonly used for both prevention and treatment in people who are at risk for or have experienced a heart attack, stroke, or venous thromboembolism. Pregnancy increases the risk of clot formation in women due to elevated levels of certain clotting factors and compounds in the body, and the risk increases even more immediately after birth and remains elevated up to 3 months after delivery. Anticoagulants must be prescribed with caution as these medications can have negative health consequences for the developing baby and need to consider dosing and medication management options.

Warfarin 
Warfarin (brand name Coumadin) is a commonly prescribed blood thinner both in the inpatient and outpatient hospital settings. In pregnant women, warfarin is contraindicated and should be avoided as it crosses the placental barrier. Additionally, warfarin is listed as Pregnancy Category D, which means it has a risk of harming the fetus. However, it has been shown that daily warfarin doses up to 5 mg may be beneficial for pregnant women who are at higher risk of thromboembolism.

Low Molecular Weight Heparin (LMWH) 
A common low molecular weight heparin drug is called enoxaparin (brand name Lovenox). Enoxaparin is listed as Pregnancy Category B, meaning animal studies have failed to show harmful effects to the fetus and therefore are safe to use in pregnant women. However, pregnant women taking LMWH may not experience the full anticoagulant effect due to the nature of the medication compared to other anticoagulants (i.e. warfarin) and may be less favorable for users as it is an injectable medication.

Unfractionated Heparin (UFH) 
Unfractionated heparin is another type of anticoagulant that has been widely used. UFH is classified as Pregnancy Category C, which means animal studies have shown potential for adverse effects to the fetus; however, there needs to be more studies done to confirm the presence of a risk to the fetus. UFH can be used in pregnant women as long as the benefits outweigh the risk.

Direct Oral Anticoagulants (DOACs) 
Direct oral anticoagulants are newer types of anticoagulants that are available as oral medications and are widely used in non-pregnant populations. As many studies looking at DOACs exclude pregnant women, there is not enough evidence to demonstrate the safety and efficacy of DOACs in pregnant women. Currently, rivaroxaban (Xarelto), dabigatran (Pradaxa), and edoxaban (Savaysa) are DOACs listed under Pregnancy Category C, and apixaban (Eliquis) is listed under Pregnancy Category B.

Antidepressants

Antidiarrheal 
Diarrhea is not a common symptom of pregnancy; however, it can occur as a result of reduced gastric acidity and slowed intestinal motility. Bismuth subsalicylate (Pepto-Bismol), loperamide (Imodium), and atropine/diphenoxylate (Lomotil) are antidiarrheal agents that can be used to treat diarrhea. However, not all of them are safe to use during pregnancy. One of the components of bismuth subsalicylate is salicylate, which is a component that crosses the placenta. Due to this, there is an increased risk for intrauterine growth retardation, fetal hemorrhage, and maternal hemorrhage within organogenesis and in the second/third trimester. Loperamide has limited data on the impact it has on pregnancy, but there is an association with cardiovascular malformation in the first trimester. Atropine/diphenoxylate currently has insufficient evidence of teratogenicity in humans, but trials with animals showed evidence of teratogenic effects.

Antihistamines 
Antihistamines may be prescribed in early pregnancy for the treatment of nausea and vomiting along with symptoms of asthma and allergies. First generation antihistamines include diphenhydramine (Benadryl), chlorpheniramine (Diabetic Tussin), hydroxizine (Atarax), and doxepin (Sinequan). Second generation antihistamines include loratadine (Claritin), cetrizine (Zyrtec), and fexofenadine (Allegra). First generation antihistamines have the ability to cross the blood-brain barrier which can result in sedative and anticholinergic effects while effectively treating allergic reactions and nausea and vomiting related to pregnancy. On the other hand, second generation antihistamines do not cross the blood-brain barrier, thus eliminating sedating effects. Currently, there is a lack of association between prenatal antihistamine exposure and birth defects.

Antihistamines during pregnancy have not been linked to birth defects; however, further research is necessary for some antihistamine medications to determine safety during pregnancy. It is suggested that women speak to their healthcare professionals before taking any over-the-counter or prescription medication while pregnant to ensure that there are no adverse health outcomes.

Anti-hypertensives 
Hypertensive issues are the most common cardiovascular disorders during pregnancy, occurring within 5 to 10% of all pregnant females. Anti-hypertensives are blood pressure medications used to treat high blood pressure in pregnant women. This class of medication is commonly used to treat problems such as heart failure, heart attack, and kidney failure. Caution must be exercised with the use of various hypertensive agents for the treatment of blood pressure. While the drug classes of Angiotensin Converting Enzyme inhibitors (ACEi), Angiotensin Receptor Blockers (ARB), and angiotensin receptor neprilysin inhibitors (ARNI) have been shown to be potent anti-hypertensive agents, their use is advised against during pregnancy. ACEi and ARB have known fetotoxicities when used during the second or third trimester or both. Signs and symptoms of ACEi and ARB use during pregnancy include kidney damage or failure, oligohydramnios, anuria, joint contractures, and hypoplasia of the skull. Common, alternative agents for high blood pressure in pregnant women include anti-adrenergic and beta-blocking medications, such as methyldopa or metoprolol, respectively.

Decongestants 
Decongestants are often used in conjunction with cold medications or to combat pregnancy rhinitis in pregnant women. Common decongestants include pseudoephedrine and phenylephrine. Pseudoephedrine is an alpha-adrenergic receptor agonist that enacts a vasoconstrictive effect to reduce airflow resistance in the nasal cavity and allow easier breathing by relieving a stuffy or congested nose. When taken in early trimesters, there has been limited evidence to associate pseudoephedrine with birth defects. However, studies often found it difficult to isolate pseudoephedrine's involvement, due to the variety of combination products that contain pseudoephedrine in conjunction with other medications. Since pseudoephedrine activates alpha adrenergic receptors, it has the ability to elevate blood pressure and cause vasoconstriction within the uterine arteries. This can negatively affect blood flow to the fetus. Due to the lack of studies, decongestants in combination drugs or isolated forms are suggested to be used sparingly during pregnancy. Saline nasal sprays, among other non-pharmacological treatments, are considered to be safe alternatives for decongestants.

Dietary supplements 
Dietary supplements such as folic acid and iron are important for a healthy pregnancy. Some dietary supplements can cause side effects and harm to the mother or unborn child. Pregnant women should discuss all dietary supplements with their health care professional to determine the appropriate dosage and which supplements are safe during pregnancy.

Caution should be taken before consuming dietary supplements while pregnant as dietary supplements are considered "foods" rather than medications and are not regulated for safety and efficacy by the FDA.

Illicit and recreational drugs

Alcohol 

Alcohol should not be consumed while pregnant. Even a small amount of alcohol is not known to be safe for the unborn baby. Alcohol passes easily from the mother's bloodstream through the placenta and into the bloodstream of the fetus. Since the fetus is smaller and does not have a fully developed liver, the concentration of alcohol in its bloodstream lasts longer, increasing the chances of detrimental side effects. The severity of effects alcohol may have on a developing fetus depends upon the amount and frequency of alcohol consumed as well as the stage of pregnancy. Rates of alcohol consumption can generally be categorized in one of three ways: heavy drinking (more than 48-60 grams of ethanol/day), moderately high drinking (24-48 grams of ethanol/day), and binge drinking (4-5 drinks/90 grams of ethanol at a time). Heavy drinking and binge drinking are closely associated with a higher risk of fetal alcohol spectrum disorders (FASDs). The most severe form of FASD is fetal alcohol syndrome (FAS). This used to be the only diagnosis for fetal disorders due to alcohol consumption, but the term was broadened to a "spectrum" due to the variety of abnormalities observed in newborns. This was most likely because of the different amounts of alcohol ingested during pregnancy indicating that there is not a clear, specific dose that determines if a fetus will be affected by alcohol or not. FAS is characterized by slower physical growth, distinct facial abnormalities including smooth philtrum, thin vermilion, and short palpebral fissures, neurological deficits, or smaller head circumference. Other problems associated with FASD include delayed or uncoordinated motor skills, hearing or vision problems, learning disabilities, behavior problems, and inappropriate social skills compared to same-age peers. Those affected are more likely to have trouble in school, legal problems, participate in high-risk behaviors, and develop substance use disorders themselves.

Caffeine 
Caffeine is a widespread drug consumed by adults due to its behavioral and stimulating effects. According to the American College of Obstetricians and Gynecologists, an acceptable intake of caffeine for pregnant women is less than or equal to 200 mg per day. Consumption of caffeine is not associated with adverse reproductive and developmental effects. The half-life of caffeine is longer in pregnancy by 8 to 16 more hours, which means that caffeine stays in the person longer, increases fetal exposure to caffeine, and is eliminated slower in the body. Other comprehensive reviews reported that caffeine intake of more than 300 mg per day have been associated with spontaneous abortions and low birth weight, but further research is needed to establish this causal relationship.

Cannabis 

Cannabis use during pregnancy should be avoided. There is no known safe dose of cannabis while pregnant and use of cannabis may lead to birth defects, pre-term birth, or low birth weight. Tetrahydrocannabinol (THC), an active ingredient in cannabis, can both cross the placenta and accumulates in high concentrations in breast milk. Cannabis consumption in pregnancy might be associated with restrictions in growth of the fetus, miscarriage, and cognitive deficits. Infants exposed to prenatal cannabis may show signs of increased tremors and altered sleep patterns. Cannabis is the most frequently used illicit drug amongst pregnant women. There are significant limitations to the current research available. One limitation is because most studies done are dated in the 1980s. Additionally, many studies done on cannabis that evaluate its safety often fail to account for confounding factors, a variable that could also be having an effect on an outcome that is not the test variable. For example, tobacco use and sociodemographic differences are often not adjusted for accordingly in many studies.

Cocaine 

Use of cocaine in pregnant women is dangerous and can lead to cardiovascular complications like hypertension, myocardial infarction and ischemia, kidney failure, liver rupture, cerebral ischemia, cerebral infarction, and maternal death. Cardiac muscles become more sensitive to cocaine in pregnancy, in the presence of increasing progesterone concentrations. Cocaine use leads to increased risk for perinatal outcomes: preterm delivery, low birth weight (less than 2500 grams) or reduced birth rate, small size and earlier gestational age at delivery.

Prenatal cocaine exposure (PCE) is associated with premature birth, birth defects, attention deficit hyperactivity disorder (ADHD), and other conditions.

Methamphetamine 
Use of methamphetamine is dangerous for pregnant women and to the unborn baby. Methamphetamines are a class of drugs that provide stimulant-like effects, including euphoria and alertness. The drug crosses the placenta and affects the fetus during the gestational stage of pregnancy. Methamphetamine use in pregnancy may lead to babies born with an earlier gestational age at delivery (pre-term), lower birth weight, and smaller head circumference. Methamphetamine use during pregnancy also negatively impacts brain development and behavioral functioning and increases the risk of the baby having ADHD and lower mental processing speed.

Opioids 
Opioids such as heroin, fentanyl, oxycodone and methadone should not be taken while pregnant. Opioid use during pregnancy may cause adverse outcomes for the women and unborn child. Women who use opioids during pregnancy in a non-medical fashion are at a higher risk for premature birth, lower birth weight, still birth, specific birth defects, and withdrawal (neonatal abstinence syndrome).

Opioids can cross the placenta and the blood brain barrier to the fetus. Opioid use is the main cause of neonatal abstinence syndrome, which is where the baby experiences withdrawals from the opioid they were exposed to during the pregnancy. Typical symptoms may include tremors, convulsions, twitching, excessive crying, poor feeding or sucking, slow weight gain, breathing problems, fever, diarrhea, and vomiting. There is no consensus on the effects on cognitive abilities. Further research is required to determine the long-term effects of in utero exposure to opioid medications on children.

Tobacco 

Smoking during pregnancy is dangerous to the unborn baby and may cause pre-term birth, birth defects such as cleft lip or cleft palate, or miscarriage. Tobacco is the most commonly used substance among pregnant women, at 25%. Nicotine crosses the placenta and accumulates within fetal tissues. Children born to women who smoked heavily were more susceptible to behavioral problems such as ADHD, poor impulse control, and aggressive behaviors. Tobacco contains carbon monoxide, which has the potential to prevent the fetus from receiving sufficient oxygen. Other health concerns tobacco poses are premature birth, low birth weight, and an increased risk of sudden infant death syndrome (SIDS) of up to three times compared to infants not exposed to tobacco. Smoking and pregnancy, combined, cause twice the risk of premature rupture of membranes, placental abruption and placenta previa. In addition to the fetus, women in general who smoke heavily are less likely to become pregnant.

Pregnancy categories 

Until 2014, the U.S. Code of Federal Regulations required that certain drugs and biological products be labelled specifically with respect to their effects on pregnant populations, including a definition of a "pregnancy category". These rules were enforced by the FDA, and medications that have been studied for their effects in pregnancy fell under the following Pregnancy Categories: A, B, C, D, or X depending on how they have been studied and what kind of results were found from the studies. In 2014, however, the FDA has developed a "Pregnancy and Lactation Labeling Rule (PLLR)" which requires product labels to include specific information related to the safety and effectiveness of medications to pregnant and lactating women. This ruling has removed the requirement of stating pregnancy categories in prescription drug labels.

Australia's categorization system takes into account birth defects, the effects around birth or when the mother gives birth, and problems that will arise later in the child's life due to the drug taken. The system places them into a category based on the severity of the consequences that the drug can have on the infant when it crosses the placenta.

References

Further reading 

 
 
 
 
 

Substance-related disorders
Obstetrics
Health issues in pregnancy